The 1982 NCAA basketball tournament was the 58th season in the Philippine National Collegiate Athletic Association (NCAA). The Letran Knights regains the championship in the Seniors division.

Seniors' tournament

Elimination round
Format:
Tournament divided into two halves: winners of the two halves dispute the championship in a best-of-3 finals series unless:
A team wins both rounds. In that case, the winning team automatically wins the championship.
A third team has a better cumulative record than both finalists. In that case, the third team has to win in a playoff against the team that won the second round to face the team that won in the first round in a best-of-3 finals series.

First round

Second round

Cumulative standings
Letram won both pennants, and was named automatic champions without need for the finals.

The Letran Knights raced to four wins in the second round and captured the NCAA Seniors crown when deposed champion Mapua beat San Beda, 78-77 on September 11, and ended hopes for the Red Lions to figure in a playoff with the Knights for the second round flag. Letran already clinch the championship even before their last game against Trinity on September 15. The Knights lost their final game to the Stallions, 89-102.

Team rosters

External links
www.gameface@bounce past
RP Basketball Photos & Articles@7/28/14

1982 in Philippine basketball
58